Oakland School for the Arts (OSA) is a visual and performing arts charter school in Oakland, California, United States. OSA opened in 2002 with a curriculum that integrated college preparatory academics with conservatory-style arts training. As of 2017, enrollment was 725 students in grades 6 through 12. It is a member of the Arts Schools Network and the National Association for College Admission Counseling. In 2009, OSA was named a California Distinguished School.

The school is located in the Fox Oakland Theatre building at 530 18th Street at Telegraph Avenue in Uptown Oakland.

Founding and history
Oakland School for the Arts is a college preparatory, arts middle and high school. It was founded in 2000 as a charter school in the Oakland Unified School District through the efforts of then Oakland Mayor Jerry Brown. It received 501(c)(3) nonprofit status in October 2001. In September 2002, OSA opened its doors with a ninth-grade class and added another high school grade each subsequent year. Loni Berry was the director of the school for the first four years. The current executive director is Lisa Sherman-Colt.

For the 2005–06 school year, a middle school was added. Initially, the middle school and high school were kept separate with different entrances and shorter school hours for the middle school. Some performances combined both middle and high school students. In later years, there has been more integration among grade levels in academic areas.

OSA began with seven art emphases: Theater, Dance, Literary Arts, Instrumental Music, Production Design, Visual Art, and Vocal Music. During the 2005–06 school year, Production Design was merged into Visual Arts. Faced with budget cuts in 2006, the school merged Theater, Arts Management, Literary Arts, and Visual Art and Design into one Theatre emphasis. In 2007, Literary Arts and Visual Art returned to separate emphases.

From 2010 to 2014 the school also offered a Circus emphasis becoming the first high school in the United States to offer circus arts as a major. OSA also used to offer an ice skating emphasis.

The school was first located at the Alice Arts Center building in downtown Oakland. It was moved to temporary buildings near the Fox Oakland Theatre during the 2004–05 school year and moved into the Fox Oakland Theater building in Uptown Oakland in January 2009. Prior to the establishment of the school, the Fox Theatre had been closed for 30 years, and its reopening as a school and major concert venue was part of an effort to revitalize the downtown area.

The first graduating senior class, the class of 2006, graduated with 100 percent of the class accepted to four-year colleges. High-school graduation and college enrollment rates continue to rank very high among San Francisco Bay Area public schools (e.g., nearly 100 percent of seniors graduated and 95 percent enrolled in college in 2013).

In April 2014, OSA became the Master Tenant of the historic Sweet's Ballroom at 1933 Broadway, which serves as a performance facility and classroom space.

In August 2016, OSA opened a new facility next door to Sweets in the J. J. Newberry's building at 1920 Telegraph Avenue to house the Instrumental Music department and the Production Design scene shop as well as a STEAM Lab.

During the pandemic, OSA was unable to use Sweets, and still has no access to it.

Arts
Oakland School for the Arts offers nine arts emphases as of the 2021–2022 school year:
 Dance
 Fashion Design
 Instrumental Music
 Literary Arts
 Media Arts (Digital Media)
 Production Design (includes Lighting & Set Design)
 Theatre (includes Musical Theatre track in high school)
 Visual Arts
 Vocal Music

Admission
Middle school students (grades 6–8) may audition for the Schools of Dance, Instrumental Music, Theatre, Digital Media, Literary Arts, Production Design, Visual Art, Fashion Design, and Vocal Music. Each year, OSA hosts two rounds of auditions, one in January and one in February. Students may audition for only two arts disciplines per round. Applicants audition before a panel of faculty and staff who assess their artistic talent and potential. Upon acceptance to the school, academic placement is determined based upon the student's prior preparation. In 2010, 30% of applicants were accepted.
As of the 2020–2021 school year, OSA is phasing out auditions. Incoming sixth graders for the 2021–2022 school year will be entered into a lottery without having to first audition to gain entry to the lottery. In the next school year, grades six and seven will be entered into a general lottery for entry, and so on.

Ranking
In the 2002–2003 school year, OSA received a score of 8 (out of 10) on the STAR (California Standardized Testing and Reporting Program) test (the highest in the school district) and in the 2003–2004 year, it received a 9, again the highest score in the district. While there was a significant drop in test scores during the 2005–06 school year, the school rebounded with improved scores for the 2006–2007 school year. From 2008 through 2014, OSA demonstrated gains each year, achieving a score of 829 in 2012 and 837 in 2013.

Controversies
During its first several years, OSA suffered a high rate of faculty and student turnover among other management problems. Changes increased faculty/staff retention to 97% in the 2008-9 and 2009–10 school years, and has retained more than 90% of its staff in all the ensuing years.

The school was criticized after Jerry Brown used an advertising billboard to raise funds. A large, lighted electronic billboard with rotating ads was installed at the toll plaza on the Oakland side of the Bay Bridge, with the proceeds benefiting OSA. The billboard was criticized because it was so bright that motorists complained it impaired their vision at night, and some residents around the bay objected to its high visibility even from San Francisco and Marin.

In another minor controversy, Brown sent out letters to Oakland families recruiting them to apply to OSA in 2007, after he had become California state Attorney General, and using his title and the state seal. Some questioned the legality of the letters, but the designated official to rule on their legality would be the California state Attorney General. Brown deemed the letters legal.

Notable artists from OSA
Sasha Berliner, jazz vibraphonist
Tati Gabrielle, actor
Kehlani, musician, singer, songwriter, dancer
Kriesha Chu, singer
Adrian Marcel, singer, songwriter, Actor
Ari'el Stachel, actor
Zendaya, actor
Alysa Liu, figure skater
Angus Cloud, actor
Jwalt, rapper
Leila Mottley, author
Satya, musician, singer

References

External links
Oakland School for the Arts website
Experience Oakland School for the Arts on Vimeo
Oakland Wiki

Education in Oakland, California
Charter preparatory schools in California
Schools in Alameda County, California
High schools in Alameda County, California
Schools of the performing arts in the United States
2002 establishments in California